The Vijay for Best Villain is given by STAR Vijay as part of its annual Vijay Awards ceremony for Tamil  (Kollywood) films.

The list
Here is a list of the award winners and the films for which they won.

Nominations
2007 Kishore - Polladhavan
Kalabhavan Mani - Vel
Milind Soman - Pachaikili Muthucharam
Prakash Raj - Pokkiri
Suman - Sivaji
2008 Kamal Haasan - Dasavathaaram
Kishore - Jayamkondaan 
Nassar - Poi Solla Porom
Sampath Raj - Saroja
2009 Rajendran - Naan Kadavul
J. D. Chakravarthy - Sarvam
Nandha - Eeram 
Sachin Khedekar - Yaavarum Nalam 
Salim Ghouse - Vettaikaaran
2010 Rajinikanth - Enthiran
A. L. Azhagappan - Easan
A. Venkatesh - Angadi Theru
Prakash Raj - Singam
Vinod Kishan - Naan Mahaan Alla
2011 Ajith Kumar - Mankatha
Jackie Shroff - Aaranya Kaandam
John Vijay - Mouna Guru
Johnny Tri Nguyen - 7am Arivu
V. I. S. Jayapalan - Aadukalam
2012 Sudeep - Naan E
 Muthuraman  - Vazhakku Enn 18/9
Narain - Mugamoodi
Thambi Ramiah - Saattai
Vidyut Jamwal - Thuppakki
 2013 Arjun - Kadal
 Rahul Bose - Vishwaroopam
 Sharath Lohitashwa - Pandiya Naadu
 Vamsi Krishna - Ivan Veramathiri
 Yog Japee - Soodhu Kavvum
 2014 Bobby Simha - Jigarthanda
Prashant Narayanan - Nedunchaalai
Prithviraj - Kaaviya Thalaivan
Charles Vinoth - Madras
Vijay Murugan - Goli Soda

See also
 Tamil cinema
 Cinema of India

References

Villain